Helicopter Shark is a composition of two photographs that gives the impression that a great white shark is leaping out of the water to attack military personnel climbing a suspended ladder attached to a Special Forces UH-60 Black Hawk helicopter. The photo was widely circulated via an email in 2001, along with a claim that it had been chosen as "National Geographic Photo of the Year". The email in question was usually written in the following form:  The photo is similar to an incident in the 1966 film Batman where a shark attacks Batman on a ladder from a helicopter. This raised suspicions that the photo in question was a hoax. National Geographic publicly disavowed the photo and the claimed award as a hoax.

The hoax has been discussed in various texts, including a marketing book to teach lessons about influence and a book on teaching critical thinking. The author Carmel Morris who was known to create and circulate many 'Photoshopped' shark attack images during this period has denied creating the helicopter shark image.

The original creator has come forward and is Bobby Hutchinson. A GaS Digital Producer who took part in Photoshop challenges on the website fark.com.

The final edited photo was created by combining a photograph of a HH-60G Pave Hawk helicopter taken by Lance Cheung for the United States Air Force (USAF), and a photo taken by South African photographer Charles Maxwell. While the helicopter photo was in fact taken in front of the Golden Gate Bridge, the photo of the shark was taken in False Bay, South Africa.

See also
 Hoax
 Internet humor
 Internet phenomenon
 Photo editing

References

External links
National Geographic News article
Swimming With the Sharks
San Francisco Bay Adventures article
Snopes article on this photo

Internet memes
Internet hoaxes
Photography forgeries
2001 hoaxes
Fictional sharks